Dongguang County is a county under the jurisdiction of the prefecture-level city of Cangzhou, in the east of Hebei province, People's Republic of China, bordering Shandong province to the southeast.

China National Highway 105 and G2 Beijing–Shanghai Expressway both pass through the county.

Administrative divisions
There are 7 towns and 2 townships under the county's administration.

Towns:
Dongguang, Lianzhen, Zhaowang, Qincun, Dengmingsi, Nanxiakou, Dadan

Townships:
Longwangli Township, Yuqiao Township

Climate

References

External links
Dongguang County Government Website
Dongguang County Population and Family Planning Board 
Dongguang County Board of Education, Culture and Sports

 

County-level divisions of Hebei
Cangzhou